JCT College of Engineering and Technology located in Pichanur Village, Madhukarai (via) Coimbatore in the state of Tamil Nadu in India, was established with the objective of providing education to all especially the down trodden and rural population. The Shri Jagannath Educational Health and Charitable Trust started the college.

It opened for the academic year of 2009-2010.

It aims at providing students with opportunities to interact with industries, knowledge, values and hands on training.

Infrastructure 
Library

The library has more than 500000 books covering all titles with reference to the norms prescribed by AICTE and Anna University. Texts, reference materials, educational encyclopedias, year books, journals and maps, audio and video cassettes  and other electronic study material including software materials are available where the students can have free access. More than one lakh national and international Journals are subscribed.

Computer Lab

Internet facility with LAN and WAN is available in the center for the students. 800 Plus computers are available with latest configuration

Class Room

The college has more than 1,50,000 square meter buildings, world class laboratories, workshops, CNC lathe and CNC Machining Center,  and facilities for indoor games and athletics.

Facilities 
JCT College of Engineering and Technology provides 10 different facilities for its students:

Sports

Indoors and outdoors sports facilities are available for all students to further develop their skills and train.

Seminars are regularly taking place

Transport

Buses ply from strategic points to enable the students and the members of staff to travel from their home to college and back. There are 23 bus routes so far serving towns and villages like: Puthukode, Pollachi, Shornur and many more.

Mechanical Lab

Hostels

Separate Hostels are available for boys and girls.

Industry visit

The institution organizes visits to industry.

Placement Cell 
With a view to provide placement opportunities to the students on completion of their course, the institution has set up a cell.

References

External links 
 

Engineering colleges in Coimbatore